The 2005–06 Sunshine Tour was the sixth season of professional golf tournaments since the southern Africa based Sunshine Tour was rebranded in 2000. The Sunshine Tour represents the highest level of competition for male professional golfers in the region.

As in the previous year, there were 21 tournaments on the schedule. The Royal Swazi Sun Classic was last held in 2004, and the Telkom PGA Pro-Am was added in 2005. The tour was based predominantly in South Africa, with 18 of the 21 tournaments being held in the country. One event each was held in Botswana, Swaziland and Namibia. Two tournaments, the Alfred Dunhill Championship and the South African Airways Open were co-sanctioned by the European Tour.

As usual, the tour consisted of two distinct parts, commonly referred to as the "Summer Swing" and "Winter Swing". Tournaments held during the Summer Swing generally had much higher prize funds, attracted stronger fields, and were the only tournaments on the tour to carry world ranking points.

The Order of Merit was won for the second straight time by Charl Schwartzel.

Schedule 
The following table lists official events during the 2005–06 season.

Order of Merit 
The Order of Merit was based on prize money won during the season, calculated in South African rand.

Notes

References

External links 

Sunshine Tour
Sunshine Tour
Sunshine Tour